The NFCA Golden Shoe Award is an award given by New Balance to the best college softball base stealer from an NFCA member institution. A committee of elected head coaches selects the winner of the award.

Winners

References

Awards established in 2005
College softball trophies and awards in the United States